Pietro Valdoni (February 22, 1900 - November 23, 1976) was a clinical surgeon and professor at Sapienza University of Rome. He represents the incarnation of the professional scientist, erudite and essayist of considerable commitment. Valdoni with his natural charisma created a new kind of experimental surgical school which still today remains a point of reference for modern doctors and surgeons. Pietro Valdoni has impressed with his work, culture and innovative force a new way of doing surgery characterizing an era of European and Worldwide medicine.

The character 
“You are born as a surgeon, but then you have to become one”: in this famous quote it is synthesized all the philosophy and awareness of his understanding of being a surgeon. For Valdoni surgery wasn’t just a profession but a choice of life, a feeling and a being in the awareness that an operation was never a clinical routine but the creative possibility of being able to save a human life. Throughout his career Valdoni has always been tormented between the urge to innovate and the hesitation for it, he always let himself be guided by the principle that his technical choices were always intended as the most appropriate for patients, he would have never opted for a choice dictated only by his desire to experience. He was adored by his students for his authoritativeness, not for his authority. He was a “tough” and icy man but he was actually very proud of his school, his team, his students to whom, in rare moments of confidence, he said: “you are dear to me as my children, I spend more time with you than with them”. He knew he was the Master and he was giving them a lot therefore he demanded great availability, precision and sense of duty.

Biography and career 
Pietro Valdoni was born in Trieste on February 22, 1900, when his land was still under the Habsburg control and in 1918, having completed his high school studies in his hometown, enrolls in the faculty of Medicine and Surgery at the University of Vienna.

Two years after the end of the Great War (1914-1918) Valdoni decides to continue his studies in Italy by moving to Bologna where he attends his third year (1920-1921). His student odyssey ends in Rome where he graduates with honors in 1924 with a thesis on orthopedic clinic which competed for the prize of the Girolami Foundation.

In 1925 he becomes assistant at the Surgical Clinic in Rome directed by Professor Roberto Alessandri. Valdoni is immediately appreciated for his cultural skills, for his great sense of duty, for his dedication to patients and respect for their suffering. Then he wins the role of permanent assistant in the clinic which he holds until the 28th of October 1939. In those years he obtains two important awards: the enrollment in the honor roll of assistants (14 March 1933) and the scientific industriousness award for 1934-1935, 1935-1936, 1936-1937. His membership in the Fascist Party was inevitable for the reconfirmation of his positions. In 1938 he is called to teach in a Surgical Clinic in Cagliari and, having ranked first in the competition for the Chair of Surgical Pathology at the University of Sassari, the following year he is called to Modena and Reggio Emilia. In 1941 during the Second World War he is called to direct the Institute of Surgical Pathology in Florence where he remained until the end of 1944. In this period he starts to write his “Surgical Pathology Manual” published in Milan in 1951. In 1945 he finally returns to Rome as Professor of Surgical Pathology and fifteen years later (1959-1970) as director of the Surgical Clinic. After the attack of the 14th of July 1948 to the secretary of the Italian Communist Party Palmiro Togliatti, Pietro Valdoni performs a thoracotomy for the extraction of a bullet and saves his life. Holder of the chairs of special surgical pathology, general surgical clinic and therapy from 1946 to 1970, Valdoni actively collaborates in the specialization schools in surgery, thoracic surgery, gastroenterology, liver and metabolic diseases, orthopedics, traumatology, oncology and infectious diseases.

Under his direction from 1948 to 1970, the Roman Surgical Clinic is totally renovated even in the spaces. In 1959 in Rome as director of the Surgical Clinic, claiming that it was no longer structurally competitive and inadequate to the progression he wanted to impose in the sector, he requests and obtains funds from the Ministry of Public Works to build a new surgical clinic equipped with the most modern equipment which will open in 1960 showing to be a model of functionality. The new building of the Surgical Clinic and two classrooms of the old building are dedicated to him. Valdoni perceived on the one hand the importance of modern diagnostic techniques, equipping his institute with a modern service of radiology and nuclear medicine, histopathology and endoscopy; on the other hand the urgency of innovative teaching methods exploiting the potential of surgical cinema. In 1959 his documentary “Open heart intracardiac Surgery” was awarded by the jury of the IV Review of specialized Cinematography.

Valdoni, throughout his long career, publishes numerous scientific writings and books; he receives innumerable honors and scientific certificates, honorary degrees from various foreign medical faculties. Professor Valdoni also becomes President of the Italian Society of Surgery and President of the Superior Health Council.

From his first marriage to Margherita De Grisogono, who died prematurely of cancer in 1963, Valdoni has five children: Rosanna, Marina, Pietro Giorgio, Francesco and Laura. In 1968 he marries Vera Lodi in second marriage. In 1970, having reached the age limits, he leaves all the public offices, including the school he founded, and retires from the profession. The great surgeon dies in 1976 of lung cancer, self-diagnosed and treated with a therapy he himself developed.

The surgeon 
“Being a surgeon is not a profession, it is a choice of life”. In the history of surgery Pietro Valdoni has occupied a position of great importance and prestige thanks to his continuous and impressive amount of work followed by a series of successes. The added value of Pietro Valdoni must be recognized in his surgical versatility that made him work on the various organs of the human body: from the gastroenteric system to the cardiovascular system, the urinary and the respiratory system.

First of all it must be said that Pietro Valdoni had an excellent diagnostic ability; this ability was supported by a rigorous preparation and a deep knowledge of anatomy, semiology and pathogenesis of diseases, a very careful evaluation of the laboratory tests and the results of instrumental diagnostics, above all his innate intuition that allowed him to orient himself even in the most difficult and complex cases. Already in 1935 his intervention of pulmonary embolectomy became a national event. Valdoni was also known throughout the world for his closed-heart and then open-heart operations, then hypothermia and extracorporeal circulation. In order to see Valdoni's operations, surgeons from all over the world came to Rome, such as the American Blalock, and the surgeon Christian Barnard started to talk about heart transplants, especially in South Africa.

In 1939 he was the first one in Europe to engage in the ligation of the Botallo arterial duct responsible for the so-called “blue disease”. In the 1940s he performed operations for pulmonary tuberculosis, pleural empyema, vertebral tuberculosis and his first pulmonary lobectomy. The first cases of complex congenital heart disease operations follow, such as the Tetralogy of Fallot. Then, again the first in Italy, he performs a mitral commissurotomy according to the Blalock technique and he begins to use cardiopulmonary bypass to perform heart operations. In the early fifties it was time for the first radical cancer operations of the esophagus and he performed a spinal cord transposition operation (Pott disease). Not to mention the huge number of endocrine surgical operations, neurosurgery and pelvic surgery: hepatic, pancreatic, gastro-enteric and renal operations always bringing innovative techniques.

The school 

Pietro Valdoni was not the first, he was not the only one, and he will not be the last to create a school in the medical field; however he left a particular mark, somewhat more incisive than the greats of medicine themselves because he conceived his school primarily as a model of life. Valdoni immediately realised that progress in surgery would never have made a qualitative leap with routine in the operating theatre: the trust would come from the organization of work, from working as a team, from the involvement of many medical figures around the same operating table, the true test for the knowledge acquired. He therefore immediately understood the importance of the departmental and interdepartmental concept of surgery interpreted as teamwork. With Valdoni, the new Institute became a true polyclinic in Policlinico Umberto I, with numerous departments, operating rooms, radiological laboratories, a general medicine clinic, a library, a museum and all kinds of special facilities, certainly paying homage to Guido Baccelli, the creator of Policlinico. And in this large and complex department, Pietro Valdoni was able to show all his enterprising and innovative surgical vitality, refined incisive, bringing gastroenterological surgery, thoraco-pulmonary, vascular, visceral and large vessel surgery to international levels, but especially cardiac surgery.

Together with the other great clinical surgeon from Turin, Achille Mario Dogliotti, he introduced modern surgery to Italy, which he practiced from 1956 to 1970, the year he retired. From the prestigious school of Pietro Valdoni, great surgeons of the calibre of Paolo Biocca graduated, excelling in thoraco-pulmonary and oncological surgery, as did Luciano Provenzale, an excellent general surgeon to whom the master entrusted the nascent sector of cardiac surgery.

Bibliography 

 Gaudio C., Mantova E., 2016. "Pietro Valdoni: l'uomo, il chirurgo, l'innovatore". Roma: Nuova Cultura
 Himetop, The History of Medicine Topographical Database
 Italian Annals of Surgery: Surgical Personality Pietro Valdoni
 Treccani Encyclopedia: "VALDONI, Pietro" https://www.treccani.it/enciclopedia/pietro-valdoni_%28Dizionario-Biografico%29/

References 

1900 births
1976 deaths
Italian surgeons